Percy Allan Taylor (10 April 1919 – 28 August 1979) was a former Australian rules footballer who played with Geelong, South Melbourne and Melbourne in the Victorian Football League (VFL).

Taylor was the joint second leading goalkicker for Melbourne in the 1944 VFL season, with 17 goals from only seven games.

Notes

External links 

1919 births
1979 deaths
Australian rules footballers from Victoria (Australia)
Geelong Football Club players
Sydney Swans players
Melbourne Football Club players
Geelong West Football Club players